The 2020–21 Moldovan "B" Division was the 30th season of Moldovan football's third-tier league. The season started on 22 August 2020 and ended on 3 July 2021. The league consisted of two regional groups, Nord (North) and Sud (South).

North

Results
Teams will play each other twice (once home, once away).

South

Results
Teams will play each other twice (once home, once away).

References

External links
 Divizia B - Results, fixtures, tables and news - Soccerway

Moldovan Liga 2 seasons
Moldova 3
2020–21 in Moldovan football